York Township is a township in Iowa County, Iowa, USA.

History
York Township was established in 1860.

References

Townships in Iowa County, Iowa
Townships in Iowa
1860 establishments in Iowa